Events from the year 1830 in Ireland.

Events
February – first Roman Catholics take their seats in the House of Commons at Westminster, among them Daniel O'Connell (for County Clare) and Richard More O'Ferrall (Kildare).
12 July – Orange Institution parades lead to confrontations between Orangemen and Ribbonmen in Maghera and Castledawson in County Londonderry. Several Catholic homes are burned by Protestants following these clashes.
July – potato crop failure the previous year leads to widespread famine. Food riots in Limerick and Leitrim.
August – first Dublin Horse Show.
November – Ribbonmen attack an Orange band, puncturing some of their drums. The Orangemen retaliate by burning the Catholic village of Maghery, County Armagh, to the ground.
Undated
 The Remonstrant Synod of Ulster is formed by non-subscribing Presbyterians.
 T. & A. Mulholland open the 8000-spindle York Street flax mill in Belfast.
 Austins established in the Diamond, Derry. At closure in 2016 it will be the world's oldest independent department store.
 Sir Jonah Barrington (being resident in France to avoid his creditors) is removed from the judiciary following an Address to the King by both Houses of Parliament, a unique event.
 William Carleton publishes Traits and Stories of the Irish Peasantry and Confessions of a Reformed Ribbonman, a fictionalised account of the Wildgoose Lodge Murders of 1816.
 The private Markree Observatory is set up.

Births
1 January – William James Lendrim, soldier, recipient of the Victoria Cross for gallantry in 1855 at the Siege of Sevastopol, Crimea (died 1891).
10 April – John Sullivan, recipient of the Victoria Cross for gallantry in 1855 at Sebastopol, in the Crimea (died 1884).
1 May – Mary Harris "Mother" Jones, labor and community organizer, member of the Industrial Workers of the World, and Socialist in America (died 1930).
12 May – Maurice O'Rorke, politician and Speaker of the New Zealand House of Representatives (died 1916).
25 May – Hugh Nelson, politician in Canada and Lieutenant-Governor of British Columbia (died 1893).
23 July – John O' Leary, Fenian poet (died 1907).
12 August – John O'Connor, painter (died 1889).
29 August – Charles Bowen, politician in New Zealand (died 1917).
16 September – Patrick Francis Moran, third Archbishop of Sydney (died 1911).
20 September – Arthur Thomas Moore, soldier, recipient of the Victoria Cross for gallantry in 1857 at the Battle of Khushab, Persia (died 1913).
20 September – Hans Garrett Moore, soldier, recipient of the Victoria Cross for gallantry in 1877 at Komgha, South Africa (died 1889).
October – John Connors, soldier, recipient of the Victoria Cross for gallantry in 1855 at Sebastopol in the Crimea (died 1857).
22 November – Justin McCarthy, politician, historian and novelist (died 1912).
24 December – Harry Hammon Lyster, recipient of the Victoria Cross for gallantry in 1858 at Calpee, India (died 1922).
Full date unknown
Brian Dillon, Fenian leader (d. c1872).
Robert Dwyer Joyce, music collector and writer (died 1883).
Charles McCorrie, soldier, recipient of the Victoria Cross for gallantry in 1855 at Sebastopol, in the Crimea (died 1857).
William R. Roberts, diplomat, Fenian Society member and United States Representative from New York (died 1897).
Eyre Massey Shaw, Superintendent of the (London) Metropolitan Fire Brigade (died 1908).

Deaths
26 June – George IV of the United Kingdom of Great Britain and Ireland (born 1762).
11 October – Richard John Uniacke, lawyer, politician, member of Nova Scotia Legislative Assembly and Attorney General of Nova Scotia (born 1753).

References

 
Years of the 19th century in Ireland
1830s in Ireland
Ireland
 Ireland